"Under der linden" is a well-known poem written by the medieval German lyric poet Walther von der Vogelweide. It is written in Middle High German. The song may have originally been sung to the surviving melody of an old French song, which matches the meter of the poem.

Manuscripts and melody
The four strophes of the song are preserved in only two manuscripts:
 The Weingarten Manuscript
 The Manesse Codex

Neither manuscript contains melodies, and the melody of the song is therefore unknown.
The melody of an anonymous Old French folk song "En mai au douz tens novels" fits the metre of the lyric, suggesting that "Under der linden" might be a contrafactum of a French original.

Text
Full Poem:

See also
 Palästinalied
 "Elegie"
 Middle High German literature
 Lyric poetry

References

External links
 Translation by Elizabeth Siekhaus

Works by Walther von der Vogelweide
Medieval compositions